T. "Blondie" Forbes was a poker player and road gambler who was the sole 1980 inductee into the Poker Hall of Fame. Forbes is credited with creating the game of Texas hold'em.

Notes

Forbes, Blondie

Year of birth missing
Year of death missing
Poker Hall of Fame inductees